Hrobce is a municipality and village in Litoměřice District in the Ústí nad Labem Region of the Czech Republic. It has about 700 inhabitants.

Administrative parts
The village of Rohatce is an administrative part of Hrobce.

References

Villages in Litoměřice District